The ninth constituency for French residents overseas (French: neuvième circonscription des Français établis hors de France) is one of eleven constituencies each electing one representative of French citizens overseas to the French National Assembly.

Area
It covers all French citizens living in the following sixteen countries of North-West Africa: Algeria, Burkina Faso, Cape Verde, Côte d'Ivoire, the Gambia, Guinea, Guinea-Bissau, Liberia, Libya, Mali, Morocco, Mauritania, Niger, Senegal, Sierra Leone, and Tunisia. (It specifically excludes Western Sahara, which is recognised neither as a part of Morocco nor as a separate country, and is not a part of any constituency.) As of New Year's Day 2011, it contained 133,936 registered French voters - of which 41,129 in Morocco, 28,287 in Algeria, 19,995 in Tunisia, 16,817 in Senegal, and 13,094 in Côte d'Ivoire.

This constituency elected its first ever representative at the 2012 French legislative election.

Deputies

Election results

2023 by-election
On January 20th, 2023, the Constitutional Council invalidated the election due to a fault in the electronic voting system.

2022

 
 
 
|-
| colspan="8" bgcolor="#E9E9E9"|
|-

2017

2012

Candidates
The list of candidates was officially finalised on 14 May. There were fourteen candidates:

The Union for a Popular Movement chose Khadija Doukkali, a resident of Morocco. André Duclos was her deputy (suppléant).

The Socialist Party chose Pouria Amirshahi, with Martine Vautrin-Djedidi as his deputy (suppléante).

The Left Front chose Laetitia Suchecki, a member of the French Communist Party. Her deputy was Jean Lemaire, a high school philosophy teacher in Casablanca.

The Democratic Movement initially chose Frédérique Ruggieri as its candidate, with Jean-François Caracci as her deputy (suppléant). The two, however, put an end to their joint ticket due to "differing points of view on certain international issues such as Syria or Palestine"; Caracci accused Ruggieri of arrogance and narrow-mindedness. Caracci withdrew from the election, while Ruggieri became an independent candidate (with Patrick Collier as deputy). The Democratic Movement endorsed Sihame Arbib in her place, with Lïla Bali as his deputy.

Europe Écologie–The Greens initially chose Guilhem Calvo, with Laurence Bonneterre as his deputy (suppléante). A resident of Morocco, Calvo was a consultant on issues of biodiversity and climate change. It was subsequently announced, however, that Zine-Eddine M'jati, born and raised in Casablanca before he moved to France and entered French politics, would be the party's candidate, still with Laurence Bonneterre as deputy.

The National Front chose Alexandra Piel, with Franck Levesque as her deputy.

The  Republican, Ecologist and Social Alliance, a centrist alliance which included in particular the centre-right Radical Party, chose Bertrand Vitu. Rachida El Amrani was his deputy.

The  centre-left Radical Party of the Left chose Aicha Guendouze, with Fodé Sylla as her deputy.

Solidarity and Progress, the French branch of the LaRouche movement, was represented by Yves Paumier, with Guy Pirod as his deputy.

Karim Dendène, a member of the Union for a Popular Movement, had sought the endorsement of that party. When he did not obtain it, he decided to stand nonetheless. Having been suspended from the party as a consequence, he stood for the "Gathering of French residents Overseas" (Rassemblement des Français de l'étranger). He was a general practitioner in Algiers. His deputy was Véronique Brigaud.

Yannick Urrien was an independent right-wing candidate. Born and raised in Casablanca, he was a media entrepreneur. His deputy was Matthias Hébert.

Alexandre Foulon was an independent left-wing candidate. An independent consultant on public policy for "several countries" in Africa, he had a home in both Casablanca and Abidjan, and alternates between the two. His deputy was Tristan Calas.

Alain Le Moullec was an independent candidate defining himself as a centrist and a social Gaullist. His deputy was Mohamed Khatiri.

Campaign
Campaigning was rendered difficult by the sheer size of the constituency. Senegalese media, however, reportedly took an active interest in the election, and relayed information and elements of the campaign to their readers and viewers - including of course French residents in Senegal, and persons with dual Senegalese and French citizenship.

A single debate was organised between the candidates, in a restaurant in Casablanca on June 30. Seven of the fourteen candidates took part, including Pouria Amirshahi (Socialist), Sihame Arbib (MoDem), Jean-Malick Lemaire (Left Front), and Zine-Eddine M'jati (EELV). In addition, the UMP sent a representative, but not its candidate, who indicated she was busy campaigning in Côte d'Ivoire. The debate enabled members of the audience to question candidates directly. In addition to the issue of fees for access to French schools abroad, which the main candidates all promised to act upon, several members of the audience asked for François Hollande to rapidly keep his promise to give the right to vote to foreign residents in France in local elections, as this would enable French residents to vote in local elections in Morocco, which grants this right on the basis of reciprocity.

Results
As in the other expatriate constituencies, turnout in the first round was low. It was at its lowest in Libya (6.7%), and within the fairly large French community in Algeria (9.7%). The highest turnout in this constituency was in Burkina Faso (32.6%). Socialist candidate Pouria Amirshahi finished first by a very large margin, almost taking the seat in the first round (47.23%). All but three of the candidates finished below 5% of the vote; dissident UMP candidate Karim Dendène, standing against his own party, obtained 7.22%, but was far behind Amirshahi and the UMP's official candidate Khadija Doukkali.

Amirshahi finished first in every country except in Côte d'Ivoire, and among the very small number of voters in Libya (where he received five votes to Doukali's eleven) and Guinea-Bissau (two votes to Doukali's seven). Côte d'Ivoire is the only country in the region in which the UMP's Khadija Doukkali finished first within a fairly sizable electorate, with 47.99% of the vote. (France's UMP government had led a military intervention in Côte d'Ivoire to help bring an end to the 2011 civil war.) In Tunisia, Amirshahi obtained 56.15% of the vote. He obtained 57.93% in Mali.

References

9